The Federal Polytechnic, Offa is a Nigerian tertiary institution located in Offa, Kwara State. Established in 1992 during the administration of Ibrahim Babangida, the polytechnic offers National Diploma and Higher National Diploma courses at undergraduate levels.

During the COVID-19 pandemic in Nigeria, the polytechnic invented "solar-powered anti-COVID-19 machines"

See also
 List of polytechnics in Nigeria

References

Federal polytechnics in Nigeria
1992 establishments in Nigeria
Educational institutions established in 1992
Education in Kwara State